The Journal of Plastic Film and Sheeting is a peer-reviewed scientific journal that covers the field of materials science, especially the development and processing of plastic film and sheeting. The editors-in-chief are John R. Wagner Jr. and James P. Harrington. It was established in 1985 and is published by SAGE Publications.

Abstracting and indexing 
The journal is abstracted and indexed in Scopus, and the Science Citation Index Expanded. According to the Journal Citation Reports, its 2020 impact factor is 2.750, ranking it 12th out of 21 journals in the category "Materials Science, Coatings & Films".

References

External links 
 

SAGE Publishing academic journals
English-language journals
Quarterly journals
Publications established in 1985
Materials science journals